is a district located in Kumamoto Prefecture, Japan.

Following the Tamana merger (but with 2003 population estimates), the district has an estimated population of 47,029 and the density of 222 persons per square kilometer. The total area is 211.54 km2.

Towns and villages
Gyokutō
Nagasu
Nagomi
Nankan

Mergers
See Merger and dissolution of municipalities of Japan.
On October 3, 2005 the towns of Taimei, Tensui and Yokoshima merged into the expanded city of Tamana.
On March 1, 2006 the towns of Kikusui and Mikawa merged to form the new town of Nagomi.

Districts in Kumamoto Prefecture